Saint Elizabeth may refer to

People
 Elizabeth (biblical figure), the mother of John the Baptist
 Elisabeth of Schönau (1129–1164), a German Benedictine visionary
 Elizabeth of Hungary (1207–1231), the daughter of King Andrew II of Hungary
 Elizabeth of Aragon or Elizabeth of Portugal (1271–1336), Queen consort of Portugal
 Elizabeth Ann Seton (1774–1821), the first American to be canonized as a saint
 Princess Elisabeth of Hesse and by Rhine (1864–1918), Eastern Orthodox saint and wife of Grand Duke Sergei Alexandrovich of Russia
 Elizabeth of the Trinity (1880–1906), French Carmelite nun

Places
 St. Elizabeth, Missouri, a village in the US
 Saint Elizabeth of the Hill Country Catholic Church, North Carolina, in the US
 Saint Elizabeth Parish, Jamaica
 St. Elizabeth Medical Center (disambiguation)

See also
 Elizabeth (given name)#Saints
 St. Elizabeth High School (disambiguation)
 St. Elizabeth's (disambiguation)
 St. Elizabeth's Church (disambiguation)
 St. Elizabeths Hospital (note the lack of an apostrophe), District of Columbia